Pedro Mártir Palomino, O.P. (died 1596) was a Roman Catholic prelate who served as Bishop-Elect of Coro (1594–1596).

Biography
Pedro Mártir Palomino was ordained a priest in the Order of Preachers. On 1 July 1594, he was appointed during the papacy of Pope Clement VIII as Bishop of Coro. He was never consecrated and died as Bishop-Elect of Coro on 22 February 1596.

References

External links and additional sources
 (for Chronology of Bishops) 
 (for Chronology of Bishops) 

16th-century Roman Catholic bishops in Venezuela
Bishops appointed by Pope Clement VIII
1596 deaths
Dominican bishops
Roman Catholic bishops of Coro